Commission v Italy (2003) C-14/00 is an EU law case, concerning the free movement of goods in the European Union.

Facts
An Italian rule limited the name ‘chocolate’ to products without vegetable fats. Those with vegetable fats, mainly British, Irish, and Danish chocolate, were made to label themselves ‘chocolate substitutes’. The Commission argued this breached Directive 73/241, passed under what is now article 115 TFEU, where article 1 said cocoa and chocolate products mean those in Annex 1, within minimum cocoa content to be described as chocolate. It also argued it infringed TFEU article 34, as the word ‘substitute’ devalued the good. Italy, under point 7(a) of the Annex said the free movement clause only applied to products without vegetable fats.

Judgment
The Court of Justice held that the requirement was contrary to article 34. Under the Directive, the UK, Ireland, Denmark could authorise manufacturers to add vegetable fats to chocolate made there, but it could not benefit from the free movement clause. TFEU article 34 applied to obstacles to marketing products. The Italian rule would make British producers adjust their products and incur additional packaging costs. The Italian law had to be justified by a mandatory requirement, and steps must be proportionate. On the facts, the addition of vegetable fat did not substantially modify the product. So a ‘neutral and objective statement’ informing consumers would be enough. Obliging a change of the sale name was going further than necessary to protect consumers.

See also

Notes

European Union food law
European Union goods case law
2003 in case law
Italian chocolate
2003 in Italy
Food politics